Apodotia (Greek: Αποδοτία) is a former municipality in Aetolia-Acarnania, West Greece, Greece. Since the 2011 local government reform it is part of the municipality Nafpaktia, of which it is a municipal unit. The municipal unit has an area of 257.635 km2. The seat of the municipality, established in 1996, was the village Ano Chora. An earlier municipality Apodotia existed between 1835 and 1912.

Subdivisions
The municipal unit Apodotia is subdivided into the following communities (constituent villages in brackets):
Ano Chora
Ampelakiotissa
Anavryti
Aspria
Grammeni Oxya
Grigori
Elatovrysi
Elatou
Kalloni
Katafygio (Katafygio, Golemi)
Kato Chora
Kentriki (Kentriki, Sellos)
Kokkinochori (Kokkinochori, Sotiro, Chrisovo)
Kryoneria
Kydonea
Lefka
Limnitsa
Mandrini
Podos
Terpsithea

References

External links
Municipality of Apodotia 

Populated places in Aetolia-Acarnania
Nafpaktia